Krugozor (lit. The Outlook) was a musical magazine with flexi-discs issued in the Soviet Union by Melodiya. The magazine was started in 1964. From 1968, it published a related-issue magazine for children, Kolobok. Krugozor was published at Pravda publishing house.

This monthly magazine dealt with documentary, history, classical and contemporary art, literature and music (including music from western countries) and was in immense demand by young Soviet consumers, who would form long waiting lines in stores and kiosks during release days. Each magazine contained up to six Flexi disks. Disks were double sided 33RPM and were produced in the Soviet Union with technology bought from the West. Nikita Khrushchev had initiated the deal; he was inspired by similar disks he had seen during his visits to Western countries.

The 1985 run of Krugozor was 500,000 monthly, not counting Kolobok. Krugozor ceased publication in 1993.

References

External links
 
Archive 1966-1987 

1964 establishments in the Soviet Union
1993 disestablishments in Russia
Defunct magazines published in Russia
Eastern Bloc mass media
Magazines established in 1964
Magazines disestablished in 1993
Russian-language magazines
Music magazines published in Russia
Soviet music
Magazines published in the Soviet Union
Flexi discs